Rooster Comb is a prominent ridge located in Henry W. Coe State Park, east of Morgan Hill, California and in Stanislaus County. Its name refers to the large fleshy red skin atop a rooster's head. The resemblance to a rooster's comb is evident by the large rock formations running the length of the ridge, separating it from the grassy slopes below. This contrast gives the illusion of a rooster's comb.

References 

Landforms of Stanislaus County, California
Ridges of California